Ana Cruz Kayne (born April 28, 1984) is an American actress. She is best known for her performances in Little Women, Jerry & Marge Go Large and Painkiller.

References

External links 

1984 births
21st-century American actresses
American film actresses
American television actresses
Living people